(lit. 'Flower of the Nation') is a periodical of East Asian art, first issued in October 1889. Kokka was established by Okakura Tenshin, journalist , and a patron of the arts who sought to challenge the primacy of Western art in Meiji Japan. Kokka is published in Japanese, with contents and some summaries in English. In 1905 an English-language edition was also published. A pioneer of collotype printing in Japan, the publication is renowned for the quality of its images.

See also
 Cultural Properties of Japan
 Datsu-A Ron

References

External links 
 CiNii Article Finder

Japanese art
Architecture in Japan
Japanese crafts
Japanese studies
Japanese-language journals
Magazines established in 1889
1889 establishments in Japan
Architecture magazines